Regan James Buckley, also called Regan Daly, (born 5 March 1997) is an Irish professional boxer. As an amateur he won a bronze medal at the 2019 European Games.

Early life

Buckley is a native of County Wicklow.

Career

Buckley boxes at St Teresa's Boxing Club in Bray.

He fought twice as a pro, defeating Gary Reeve and Carl McDonald in 2018. However, he returned to amateur status to aim at the 2020 Olympics.

Buckley won bronze at the 2019 European Games in Minsk.

References

Living people
1997 births
Sportspeople from County Wicklow
Irish male boxers
European Games bronze medalists for Ireland
European Games medalists in boxing
Boxers at the 2019 European Games
Flyweight boxers